The Interstate Oil and Gas Compact Commission (IOGCC), formerly the Interstate Oil Compact Commission, is a United States organization, representing the governors of 31 member and seven associate states, that works to ensure the nation's oil and natural gas resources are conserved and utilized to their maximum potential while protecting health, safety and the environment.

Background
In the early days of oil exploration, drilling was governed by the law of capture, which states that the owner of land on which a well resides has the right to any oil from that well even if it was drained from the land of his neighbors. This provided an incentive for each land owner to extract the oil as fast as possible. Each state tried to regulate its own oil by such measures as proration, the limiting of production to some fraction of capacity; but then two great oil fields, the Oklahoma City Oil Field and the East Texas Oil Field, were discovered. This, along with the Great Depression, led to much waste and very low prices, with a catastrophic effect on the industry. The problems were large enough that the states recognized the need for cooperation.

The compact was formed in 1935 as the Interstate Compact to Conserve Gas and Oil. The purpose of the compact was to eliminate the glut of oil and raise prices for consumers. The interstate compact was seen as an alternative to direct federal regulation that would allow oil producing states to retain more control.

While the National Guard occupied wells in Oklahoma and Texas in 1931–1932, an Oil States Advisory Committee drafted the Thomas-McKeon Bill, which proposed an interstate oil compact and a Federal Interstate Oil Board to recommend quotas. However, the bill was abandoned after oil industry representatives withdrew their support. From 1933 to 1935, oil was regulated under the National Industrial Recovery Act and the Petroleum Code, which in effect left production control in the hands of industry representatives, with no representation for the states. The Supreme Court found these regulations unconstitutional in 1935, and the idea of an interstate compact was revived. On December 3, 1934, Oklahoma Governor-elect E. W. Marland met with the governors of Kansas and Texas to discuss an interstate compact. This led to the drafting of the Interstate Compact to Conserve Oil and Gas, which was ratified by Congress on August 27, 1935. At first, Congress ratified it for only two years at a time, then four years, and finally the compact was made permanent in 1979.

Some economic historians have described the regulation of oil output under the compact as an example of a price fixing cartel. The production controls of the IOGCC and the Texas Railroad Commission have been cited as precursors to the establishment of OPEC's caps on member state oil production.

The stated purpose of the compact was "conserve oil and gas by the prevention of physical waste thereof from any cause". States that ratified the compact agreed to enact legislation for this purpose. Article VI of the compact constituted "The Interstate Oil Compact Commission," renamed as the Interstate Oil and Gas Compact Commission in 1991, and its duty was to make recommendations for preventing the physical waste of gas and oil.

Organizational structure

Initially the commission had six members: Colorado, Illinois, Kansas, New Mexico, Oklahoma and Texas. It now has 31 member states, 7 associate states and 10 international affiliates (including 7 Canadian provinces and territories). The governor of each member state appoints an official representative who can vote on policy recommendations, and any number of associate representatives who can vote in their place if the official representative is not available. The list of members can be found on the IOGCC website. Many representatives are state regulators overseeing gas and drilling, but as of 2010 at least seven were industry executives and lobbyists.
The commission meets biannually, but much of its work occurs in small committee meetings throughout the year. To govern operations, it has steering, finance, resolutions and nominating committees. Other committees are Energy Resources, Research and Technology; Environment and Safety; International; Public Lands; Public Outreach; and State Review.

Transparency and accountability
The IOGCC is governed by the compact and several bylaws. The compact did not provide for any resources to support IOGCC; a later bylaw stipulated that its expenses would be paid "from voluntary contributions from the member states and other sources of revenue approved by the Commission". These sources, which include federal grants, have proved to be enough to allow the commission to function. IOGCC uses an Oklahoma government email address and domain but it is not a state, not a federal agency and does not have to register to lobby the federal government. A plethora of information is available but relatively little of it has come directly from the organization itself. IOGCC claims an exemption from the Open Public Records Act and has removed a provision within its by-laws that formerly said its records are open to the public.

Activities
To identify best practices, IOGCC surveys member states and assesses their activities. It catalogues innovative programs and shares the information with states, and it hosts biannual meetings that draw together representatives from the government, the oil industry and environmentalists. IOGCC is an advocate for states' rights, arguing that state regulation is more effective than "one size fits all" federal regulation. As well as creating reports, it creates model statutes as a guide for legislation by states.

Issues that IOGCC has worked on include national energy policy, carbon sequestration, environmental stewardship, hydraulic fracturing and produced water.

Price fixing
In the 1930s and 1940s, the commission functioned as a price fixing cartel. According to the legal scholar Blakely Murphy, the commission operated under the guise of resource conservation but primarily existed to protect the interests of oil producers.

Carbon sequestration
A large part of the human contribution to global warming is from the emission of carbon dioxide (CO2) as a result of burning fossil fuels. One way to reduce the contribution is to capture the CO2 before it enters the atmosphere and sequester it by injecting underground in depleted oil and natural gas fields, saline formations and coal beds. Recognizing that the oil and gas industry has a lot of experience with injecting CO2 into the ground for enhanced oil recovery, the IOGCC launched the Geological  Sequestration Task Force in 2002 to investigate the issues surrounding sequestration. A two-phase study was funded by the Department of Energy. Phase I concluded that the states had the knowledge and experience to regulate sequestration safely. In phase II, started in 2006, the task force prepared a report that included a model statute for the states with explanations on how to implement it.

Awards
The IOGCC has three awards. The E. W. Marland Award, established in 1994, recognizes an outstanding state legislator. The Warwick Downing Award, established in 2005, recognizes an individual outside state governments who has made an outstanding contribution to the IOGCC. The highest honor, established in 2001, is the Chairman's Stewardship Award for exemplary efforts in environmental stewardship. This award has four categories: Environmental Partnership (for partnerships with industry led by non-industry organizations); Energy Education; Small Company and Large Company.

References

Further reading

External links

Petroleum in the United States
Petroleum organizations
Natural gas in the United States
Natural gas organizations
Organizations based in Oklahoma City
United States interstate compacts
Government agencies established in 1935